Chimimport AD is a Bulgarian holding company. Since 2007 the company is listed on the Bulgarian Stock Exchange - Sofia and participates in the main Bulgarian  index SOFIX. The company has subsidiaries in Bulgaria, Russia, Slovakia, the Netherlands, North Macedonia, the Seychelles, and Germany.

References

Companies based in Sofia
Holding companies established in 1947
1947 establishments in Bulgaria
Holding companies of Bulgaria